The Worcester, Bromyard and Leominster Railway was a  single track branch railway line, that ran between a junction near  on the West Midland Railway line south of Worcester (present day Cotswold Line) to the Shrewsbury and Hereford Railway line south of .

History

Construction 
Authority was also given for £200,000 capital to be raised by the selling of £10 shares, with a quarter to be purchased by the West Midland Railway, plus an additional £65,000 in loans if necessary.

The limited company was formed under the chairmanship of Sir Charles Hastings, founder of the British Medical Association. Originally authorised to be constructed in five years, it eventually took 36 years to construct the complete line, opened in four sections, finishing in 1897.

In a special General meeting in March 1864, it was revealed that the company had already spent £20,000, yet neither had all the land been purchased nor had the construction contract been signed. The shareholders voted for the board to apply for an extension, which was agreed until 1869. Construction work on the line ceased in December 1866 when the contractor was declared bankrupt, with the contract re-let to a Mr. Jackson for completion by January 1867. In June 1867, with only £67 cash left in the company's accounts, a plea was made by the company to local farmers, tenants and landowners. By 1869, the company had made a successful application to the Board of Trade for a certificate allowing them to abandon the plans for the Bromyard to Leominster section, and a further extension to 28 June 1871.

Leominster and Bromyard Railway 
It had to raise £210,000, with authorisation for an additional £70,000 via a mortgage if needed.

Built by new contractor Mr Riddy, the first section ran from Bromyard Junction ( west of Bromyard), to Yearsett was opened in May 1874. The last  to Bromyard were completed in 1877. Opened on Monday 22 October 1877, it had cost £17,000/mile to build. With workings sub-contracted to the Great Western Railway, a special 14 carriage train left  at noon, arriving in Bromyard at 1pm.

Operation 
Although locally popular, the line rarely made a profit, and the operating company went into liquidation. Acquired from the liquidator in 1888 by the Great Western Railway for £20,000, it completed the line and opened the remaining stations in 1897.

Traffic was light, although by 1932 three trains ran the line on a Sunday, and certain events drove the traffic greatly higher. The Bromyard Races were a popular event, and in 1884 almost 7,000 people turned out to see them, most via train. The line was also used by seasonal hop-pickers in September, seeking temporary work. In 1929  was opened between Leominster and Steens Bridge.

Passenger service was worked by a GWR Autocoach powered by GWR Class 517 0-4-2T locomotive, with GWR Pannier 0-6-0PT's used for freight. In later years more modern locomotives were introduced, and on occasions a GWR diesel railcar.

The wagon's hand brake failed, and it started to accelerate towards Leominster. When the wagon arrived, it smashed the Buffer stop, breaking the wagon itself into pieces and spilling coal down the river bank.

Closure 
Post World War II, and with the greater use of the motorbus and private cars, traffic on the line fell considerably. The stations all became unstaffed as a station from September 1949, and the line between Bromyard and Leominster closed to regular passenger services on 15 September 1952 but remained open from Bromyard to Worcester.

On 26 April 1958 a special train organised by the Stephenson Locomotive Society ran from Worcester via Bromyard to Leominster, calling at Rowden Mill, Fencote and Steens Bridge. Headed by ex-GWR 4500 Class 2-6-2T No.4571, the 50 society members/passengers rode on the last train that would run on the complete track before it was removed.

The Worcester to Bromyard section, initially kept open for the storage of 600+ disused and soon to be scrapped railway vans and wagons, was closed under the Beeching Axe in 1964. The line was removed in 1965, with the track bed being offered for sale for £54,000 but there were no takers.

Present 

After being closed, most of the line was sold off to the original private land owners.

North beyond Stoke Prior Halt, the track ran parallel for over a mile to the Shrewsbury and Hereford line, which was redeveloped as part of the Leominster bypass.

Of the stations,  has been redeveloped as a housing estate, with semi-detached bungalows built along the line of the platforms edge. While  is now a derelict shell covered in ivy,  is a private residence.

Bromyard and Linton Light Railway 

The former site of  station has been redeveloped as an industrial estate, but beyond the former railway bridge on part of the original BR sidings,  Bob Palmer built the  track along the old rights of way towards Worcester as far as the Avenbury Lane bridge. Not normally open to the public, it was occasionally open as a static museum. The rolling stock consisted mainly of Motor-Rails and Ruston diesel-powered engines, and a singular Peckett and Sons steam locomotive, No.1327 0-6-0ST of 1913 named Mesozoic. This train originally ran on the Southam Cement railway in Warwickshire. Presently closed, it is hoped to reopen the railway to allow public access.

Rowden Mill 

 was bought and restored as a private residence by John Wilkinson. He later re-installed sections of the track either side of station, on which are presently housed British Rail Class 03 shunter No.D2371, various Wickham self-propelled trolleys, some carriages, goods wagons and a GWR Toad brake van. At private gatherings, the stock is propelled along the line, while the site is opened occasionally for public access and viewing, but without operational trains.

Fencote 
No track extends between the two stations.

References

Bibliography

External links 
 County Council line history
 BBC Line history
 Warwickshire Railways

Railway companies established in 1861
Railway companies disestablished in 1888
Railway lines opened in 1897
Great Western Railway constituents
Rail transport in Worcestershire
Rail transport in Herefordshire
Closed railway lines in the West Midlands (region)
1861 establishments in England